Adelir Antônio de Carli (Pelotas, Rio Grande do Sul, Brazil, February 8, 1967 - April 20, 2008), also known in Brazil as Padre Baloeiro or Padre do Balão ("Balloon Priest" in Portuguese), was a Brazilian Catholic priest, who died during an attempt at cluster ballooning on April 20, 2008. Carli, an experienced skydiver, undertook the exercise in order to raise money to fund a spiritual rest area for truck drivers in the Paraná port city of Paranaguá.

Human rights advocate
In 2006, de Carli denounced human rights violations against homeless people in Paranaguá. These denunciations caused seven Municipal Guard agents and the municipal security secretary to be arrested.

Previous cluster ballooning attempts
De Carli's goal for the cluster ballooning exercise was to break the 19-hour flight record and claim a new world record.

Fatal cluster ballooning attempt

On April 20, 2008, after taking off in a chair attached to 1,000 balloons, Carli reached an altitude of  before losing contact with authorities. Pieces of balloon were later reported floating in the sea off the coast.

Carli's flight equipment included a parachute, helmet, waterproof coveralls, GPS device, mobile phone, satellite phone, flotation device chair, aluminum thermal flight suit, and at least five days of food and drinking water. His training for the stunt included jungle survival and mountain climbing courses, but apparently did not include instruction on the use of his GPS navigation device. On April 20, the priest's last contact with the military police occurred during the night, when he was about 16 miles from the islands of Tamboretes, off the coast of São Francisco do Sul, Santa Catarina, Brazil. The priest called from his cell phone to request help determining his coordinates and to ask them to contact the authorities. Two days after the flight, a Penha (SC) Fire Department commander familiar with the situation put the missing priest's chances of still being alive at 80%. The Brazilian Navy called off the ocean search on April 29, saying the chances of finding de Carli alive in the ocean were "very remote".

After the remains were initially identified from the clothing as those belonging to Carli, DNA tests confirmed they were his on July 29, 2008 after a comparison was made with DNA samples from Carli's brother.

See also
Bartolomeu de Gusmão
Danny Deckchair
Lawnchair Larry flight
List of unusual deaths
Matías Pérez (balloonist)

References

External links
News video of de Carli taking off and disappearing in the clouds

1966 births
2008 deaths
Brazilian balloonists
20th-century Brazilian Roman Catholic priests
Catholic clergy scientists
Accidents and incidents involving balloons and airships
Victims of aviation accidents or incidents in Brazil
People from Pelotas
21st-century Brazilian Roman Catholic priests
Victims of aviation accidents or incidents in 2008